This is a list of players who have played at least one game for the Winnipeg Jets (2011–12 to present) of the National Hockey League (NHL). This list does not include players from the Atlanta Thrashers of the NHL.

Key
  Appeared in a Jets game during the 2021–22 season.

The "Seasons" column lists the first year of the season of the player's first game and the last year of the season of the player's last game. For example, a player who played one game in the 2000–01 season would be listed as playing with the team from 2000 to 2001, regardless of what calendar year the game occurred within.

Statistics complete as of the 2021–22 NHL season.

Goaltenders

Skaters

References
hockeydb.com

 
players
Winnipeg Jets